Bensoniella is a monotypic genus of plants in the saxifrage family containing the single species Bensoniella oregona (also, B. oregana), which is known by the common name Oregon bensoniella, or simply bensoniella. This plant is endemic to the Klamath Mountains of northern California and southern Oregon. This is a plant of the wet forest understory and meadows above 1000 meters in elevation. It is a perennial herb which grows from a rhizome and bears rounded to heart-shaped lobed leaves with woolly petioles and tall, thin racemes of flowers. Each flower is white with bright yellow-pink anthers. The plant produces capsules of abundant seeds but also reproduces vegetatively. When it does reproduce sexually, it often self-pollinates. Bensoniella is not endangered but it is a species of some concern for several reasons, including lack of genetic diversity in part due to its habit of self-pollination and asexual reproduction, its relatively narrow tolerance of habitats, its small range of distribution, habitat destruction due to logging, grazing, and road-building, and erosion. The plant was first collected in 1916 by John Hunter Thompson.

References

External links
Jepson Manual Treatment
USDA Plants Profile
Bensoniella Conservation Report
Photo gallery

Saxifragaceae
Monotypic Saxifragales genera
Flora of California
Flora of Oregon
Saxifragaceae genera